Francisco "Pancho" Salvador Osorto Guardado (20 March 1957 – 26 February 2023) was a Salvadoran footballer who played as a defender.

Club career
Osorto won the Nacional Liga B league title in 1983 with his hometown club Municipal Limeño.

International career
Nicknamed Pancho, Osorto represented his country in five FIFA World Cup qualification matches and played at the 1982 FIFA World Cup in Spain. In 1977, he scored for El Salvador in an 8–0 drubbing of Nicaragua in qualification for the 1978 Central American and Caribbean Games.

Personal life and death
Osorto was married to Evelyn Rubio and the couple have four sons. His son Heraldo Salvador Osorto was a professional footballer with Atlético Marte and San Salvador.

Osorto died from liver failure on 26 February 2023, at the age of 65.

Honours
Municipal Limeno
Liga B: 1983

Santiagueno
Primera División de Fútbol de El Salvador: 1979-1980

El Salvador
Central American and Caribbean Games: 1978

External links

References

1957 births
2023 deaths
People from La Unión Department
Salvadoran footballers
Association football defenders
El Salvador international footballers
C.D. Luis Ángel Firpo footballers
A.D. Isidro Metapán footballers
1982 FIFA World Cup players
Competitors at the 1978 Central American and Caribbean Games